Illegal Art is a sampling record label that was started in 1998. The label gained immediate notoriety from legal threats surrounding Deconstructing Beck, a compilation made exclusively from sampling Beck's music. This was followed by two other theme-based compilations, Extracted Celluloid and Commercial Ad Hoc.  All three were co-released with Negativland's Seeland Records label and sponsored by RTMark.  After these theme-based compilations, Illegal Art focused on artist releases.  One of the most popular artists on the label is Girl Talk (Gregg Gillis), who in 2006 released his third album, Night Ripper, to critical acclaim on the label, earning a Wired magazine Rave Award a year later.

Illegal Art also released the Steinski Retrospective, spanning his work from 1983 to 2006. It includes the legendary "Lessons", which have been described as "one of the most desirable and prized bootleg recordings in hip hop" (Antidote). It also contains a variety of other essential tracks, and his critically acclaimed Nothing to Fear: A Rough Mix, an hour-long mashup that was produced for Solid Steel/BBC London and hailed as "the closest to a masterpiece the genre has produced."

As of April 2014, Illegal Art's website states that the label has been on an "indefinite hiatus" since 2012.

Artists
 The Bran Flakes
 Girl Talk
 P. Miles Bryson
 People Like Us
 Steinski
 Wobbly
 Legion of Doom

See also
 List of record labels: I–Q

References

External links
 Illegal Art's Website
 Radio Feature The Some Assembly Required Interview with Illegal Art's Philo T. Farnsworth (2001).
 Illegal Art Exhibition Compilation CD

American record labels
Record labels established in 1998
Electronic music record labels
Mashup